Bisgoeppertia is a genus of flowering plants belonging to the family Gentianaceae.

Its native range is Cuba, Hispaniola.

Species:

Bisgoeppertia gracilis 
Bisgoeppertia robustior 
Bisgoeppertia scandens

References

Gentianaceae
Gentianaceae genera